

Events

Pre-1600
 305 – Diocletian and Maximian retire from the office of Roman emperor.
 880 – The Nea Ekklesia is inaugurated in Constantinople, setting the model for all later cross-in-square Orthodox churches.
1169 – Norman mercenaries land at Bannow Bay in Leinster, marking the beginning of the Norman invasion of Ireland.
1328 – Wars of Scottish Independence end: By the Treaty of Edinburgh–Northampton, England recognises Scotland as an independent state.
1486 – Christopher Columbus presents his plans discovering a western route to the Indies to the Spanish Queen Isabella I of Castile.

1601–1900
1707 – The Act of Union joining England and Scotland to form the Kingdom of Great Britain takes effect.
1753 – Publication of Species Plantarum by Linnaeus, and the formal start date of plant taxonomy adopted by the International Code of Botanical Nomenclature.
1807 – The Slave Trade Act 1807 takes effect, abolishing the slave trade within the British Empire.
1820 – Execution of the Cato Street Conspirators, who plotted to kill the British Cabinet and Prime Minister Lord Liverpool.
1840 – The Penny Black, the first official adhesive postage stamp, is issued in the United Kingdom.
1844 – Hong Kong Police Force, the world's second modern police force and Asia's first, is established.
1846 – The few remaining Mormons left in Nauvoo, Illinois, formally dedicate the Nauvoo Temple.
1851 – Queen Victoria opens The Great Exhibition at The Crystal Palace in London.
1863 – American Civil War: The Battle of Chancellorsville begins.
1865 – The Empire of Brazil, Argentina, and Uruguay sign the Treaty of the Triple Alliance.
1866 – The Memphis Race Riots begin. In three days time, 46 blacks and two whites were killed. Reports of the atrocities influenced passage of the Fourteenth Amendment to the United States Constitution.
1885 – The original Chicago Board of Trade Building opens for business.
1886 – Rallies are held throughout the United States demanding the eight-hour work day, culminating in the Haymarket affair in Chicago, in commemoration of which May 1 is celebrated as International Workers' Day in many countries.
1894 – Coxey's Army, the first significant American protest march, arrives in Washington, D.C.
1898 – Spanish–American War: Battle of Manila Bay: The Asiatic Squadron of the United States Navy destroys the Pacific Squadron of the Spanish Navy after a seven-hour battle. Spain loses all seven of its ships, and 381 Spanish sailors die. There are no American vessel losses or combat deaths.
1900 – The Scofield Mine disaster kills over 200 men in Scofield, Utah in what is to date the fifth-worst mining accident in United States history.

1901–present
1915 – The  departs from New York City on her 202nd, and final, crossing of the North Atlantic. Six days later, the ship is torpedoed off the coast of Ireland with the loss of 1,198 lives.
1919 – German troops enter Munich to suppress the Bavarian Soviet Republic.
1925 – The All-China Federation of Trade Unions is officially founded. Today it is the largest trade union in the world, with 134 million members.
1929 – The 7.2  Kopet Dag earthquake shakes the Iran–Turkmenistan border region with a maximum Mercalli intensity of IX (Violent), killing up to 3,800 and injuring 1,121.
1930 – "Pluto" is officially proposed for the name of the newly discovered dwarf planet Pluto by Vesto Slipher in the Lowell Observatory Observation Circular. The name quickly catches on.
1931 – The Empire State Building is dedicated in New York City.
1945 – World War II: A German newsreader officially announces that Adolf Hitler has "fallen at his command post in the Reich Chancellery fighting to the last breath against Bolshevism and for Germany". The Soviet flag is raised over the Reich Chancellery, by order of Stalin.
  1945   – World War II: Up to 2,500 people die in a mass suicide in Demmin following the advance of the Red Army.
1946 – Start of three-year Pilbara strike of Indigenous Australians.
1947 – Portella della Ginestra massacre against May Day celebrations in Sicily by the bandit and separatist leader Salvatore Giuliano where 11 persons are killed and 33 wounded.
1956 – The polio vaccine developed by Jonas Salk is made available to the public.
1957 – A Vickers VC.1 Viking crashes while attempting to return to Blackbushe Airport in Yateley, killing 34.
1960 – Cold War: U-2 incident: Francis Gary Powers, in a Lockheed U-2 spyplane, is shot down over the Sverdlovsk Oblast, Soviet Union, sparking a diplomatic crisis.
1961 – The Prime Minister of Cuba, Fidel Castro, proclaims Cuba a socialist nation and abolishes elections.
1970 – Vietnam War: Protests erupt following the announcement by Richard Nixon that the U.S. and South Vietnamese forces would attack Vietnamese communists in a Cambodian Campaign.
1971 – Amtrak (the National Railroad Passenger Corporation) takes over operation of U.S. passenger rail service.
1975 – The Särkänniemi Amusement Park opens in Tampere, Finland.
1978 – Japan's Naomi Uemura, travelling by dog sled, becomes the first person to reach the North Pole alone.
1982 – Operation Black Buck: The Royal Air Force attacks the Argentine Air Force during Falklands War.
1994 – Three-time Formula One champion Ayrton Senna is killed in an accident during the San Marino Grand Prix.
1999 – The body of British climber George Mallory is found on Mount Everest, 75 years after his disappearance in 1924.
2004 – Cyprus, Czech Republic, Estonia, Hungary, Latvia, Lithuania, Malta, Poland, Slovakia, and Slovenia join the European Union, celebrated at the residence of the Irish President in Dublin.
2009 – Same-sex marriage is legalized in Sweden.
2011 – Pope John Paul II is beatified by his successor, Pope Benedict XVI.
2018 – Syrian civil war: The Syrian Democratic Forces (SDF) resumes the Deir ez-Zor campaign in order to clear the remnants of the Islamic State of Iraq and the Levant (ISIL) from the Iraq–Syria border.
2019 – Naxalite attack in Gadchiroli district of India: Sixteen army soldiers, including a driver, killed in an IED blast. Naxals targeted an anti-Naxal operations team.
  2019   – Naruhito ascends to the throne of Japan succeeding his father Akihito, beginning the Reiwa period.

Births

Pre-1600
1218 – John I, Count of Hainaut (d. 1257)
  1218   – Rudolf I of Germany (d. 1291)
1285 – Edmund FitzAlan, 9th Earl of Arundel, English politician (d. 1326)
1326 – Rinchinbal Khan, Mongolian emperor (d. 1332)
1488 – Sidonie of Bavaria, eldest daughter of Duke Albrecht IV of Bavaria-Munich (d. 1505)
1527 – Johannes Stadius, German astronomer, astrologer, mathematician (d. 1579)
1545 – Franciscus Junius, French theologian (d. 1602)
1579 – Wolphert Gerretse, Dutch-American farmer, co-founded New Netherland (d. 1662)
1582 – Marco da Gagliano, Italian composer (d. 1643)
1585 – Sophia Olelkovich Radziwill, Belarusian saint (d. 1612)
1591 – Johann Adam Schall von Bell, German missionary and astronomer (d. 1666)
1594 – John Haynes, English-American politician, 1st Governor of the Colony of Connecticut (d. 1653)

1601–1900
1602 – William Lilly, English astrologer (d. 1681)
1672 – Joseph Addison, English essayist, poet, playwright, and politician (d. 1719)
1730 – Joshua Rowley, English admiral (d. 1790)
1735 – Jan Hendrik van Kinsbergen, Dutch admiral and philanthropist (d. 1819)
1751 – Judith Sargent Murray, American poet and playwright (d. 1820)
1764 – Benjamin Henry Latrobe, English-American architect, designed the United States Capitol (d. 1820)
1769 – Arthur Wellesley, 1st Duke of Wellington, Irish-English field marshal and politician, Prime Minister of the United Kingdom (d. 1852)
1783 – Phoebe Hinsdale Brown, American hymnwriter (d. 1861)
1803 – James Clarence Mangan, Irish poet and author (d. 1849)
1811 – Andreas Laskaratos, Greek satirical poet and writer (d. 1901) 
1821 – Henry Ayers, English-Australian politician, 8th Premier of South Australia (d. 1897)
1824 – Alexander William Williamson, English chemist and academic (d. 1904)
1825 – Johann Jakob Balmer, Swiss mathematician and physicist (d. 1898)
  1825   – George Inness, American painter and educator (d. 1894)
1827 – Jules Breton, French painter (d. 1906)
1829 – José de Alencar, Brazilian author and playwright (d. 1877)
  1829   – Frederick Sandys, English painter and illustrator (d. 1904)
1830 – Guido Gezelle, Belgian priest and poet (d. 1899)
1831 – Emily Stowe, Canadian physician and activist (d. 1903)
1847 – Henry Demarest Lloyd, American journalist and politician (d. 1903)
1848 – Adelsteen Normann, Norwegian painter (d. 1919)
1850 – Prince Arthur, Duke of Connaught and Strathearn (d. 1942)
1852 – Calamity Jane, American frontierswoman and professional scout (d. 1903)
  1852   – Santiago Ramón y Cajal, Spanish neuroscientist and pathologist, Nobel Prize laureate (d. 1934)
1853 – Jacob Mikhailovich Gordin, Ukrainian-American journalist, actor, and playwright (d. 1909)
1855 – Cecilia Beaux, American painter and academic (d. 1942)
1857 – Theo van Gogh, Dutch art dealer (d. 1891)
1859 – Jacqueline Comerre-Paton, French painter and sculptor (d. 1955)
1862 – Marcel Prévost, French novelist and playwright (d. 1941)
1864 – Anna Jarvis, American founder of Mother's Day (d. 1948)
1871 – Seakle Greijdanus, Dutch theologian and scholar (d. 1948)
  1871   – Emiliano Chamorro Vargas, President of Nicaragua (d. 1966)
1872 – Hugo Alfvén, Swedish composer, conductor, violinist, and painter (d. 1960)
  1872   – Sidónio Pais, Portuguese soldier and politician, 4th President of Portugal (d. 1918)
1874 – Romaine Brooks, American-French painter and illustrator (d. 1970)
  1874   – Paul Van Asbroeck, Belgian target shooter (d. 1959)
1875 – Dave Hall, American runner (d. 1972)
1881 – Pierre Teilhard de Chardin, French priest, palaeontologist, and philosopher (d. 1955)
1884 – Francis Curzon, 5th Earl Howe, English race car driver and politician (d. 1964)
1885 – Clément Pansaers, Belgian poet (d. 1922)
  1885   – Ralph Stackpole, American sculptor and painter (d. 1973)
1887 – Alan Cunningham, Anglo-Irish general and diplomat, High Commissioners for Palestine and Transjordan (d. 1983)
1890 – Clelia Lollini, Italian physician (d. 1963 or 1964)
1891 – Lillian Estelle Fisher, American historian of Spanish America (d. 1988)
1895 – Nikolai Yezhov, Soviet secret police official, head of the NKVD (d. 1940)
  1895   – May Hollinworth, Australian theatre producer and director (d. 1968)
1896 – Herbert Backe, German agronomist and politician (d. 1947)
  1896   – Mark W. Clark, American general (d. 1984)
  1896   – J. Lawton Collins, American general (d. 1987)
1898 – Alfred Schmidt, Estonian weightlifter (d. 1972)
1900 – Ignazio Silone, Italian journalist and politician (d. 1978)
  1900   – Aleksander Wat, Polish poet and writer (d. 1967)

1901–present
1901 – Sterling Allen Brown, American poet, academic, and critic (d. 1989)
  1901   – Heinz Eric Roemheld, American pianist, composer, and conductor (d. 1985)
  1901   – Antal Szerb, Hungarian scholar and author (d. 1945)
1905 – Henry Koster, German-American director, producer, and screenwriter (d. 1988)
1906 – Horst Schumann, German SS officer and physician (d. 1983)
1907 – Hayes Alvis, American bassist (d. 1972)
  1907   – Kate Smith, American singer and actress (d. 1986)
1908 – Giovannino Guareschi, Italian journalist and author (d. 1968)
  1908   – Morris Kline, American mathematician and academic (d. 1992)
1909 – Endel Puusepp, Estonian-Soviet military pilot and politician (d. 1996)
  1909   – Yiannis Ritsos, Greek poet and playwright (d. 1990) 
1910 – Behice Boran, Turkish sociologist and politician (d. 1987)
  1910   – Raya Dunayevskaya, Ukrainian-American philosopher and activist (d. 1987)
  1910   – Dirk Andries Flentrop, Dutch organ builder (d. 2003)
  1910   – J. Allen Hynek, American astronomer and ufologist (d. 1986)
  1910   – Nejdet Sançar, Turkish literature teacher (d. 1975)
1911 – Wilfred Watson, English-Canadian poet, playwright and educator (d. 1998)
1912 – Otto Kretschmer, German admiral (d. 1998)
1913 – Louis Nye, American actor (d. 2005)
  1913   – Walter Susskind, Czech-English pianist, conductor, and educator (d. 1980)
1914 – Jaap van der Poll, Dutch javelin thrower (d. 2010)
1915 – Hanns Martin Schleyer, German businessman (d. 1977)
1916 – Antoni Bazaniak, Polish sprint canoeist (d. 1979)
  1916   – Glenn Ford, Canadian-American actor and producer (d. 2006)
1917 – John Beradino, American baseball player and actor (d. 1996)
  1917   – Ulric Cross, Trinidadian navigator, judge, and diplomat (d. 2013)
  1917   – Danielle Darrieux, French actress and singer (d. 2017)
  1917   – Ahron Soloveichik, Russian rabbi and scholar (d. 2001)
1918 – Gersh Budker, Ukrainian-Russian physicist and academic (d. 1977)
  1918   – Jack Paar, American comedian, author and talk show host (d. 2004)
  1918   – Dimitri Papadimos, Greek photographer (d. 1994) 
1919 – Manna Dey, Indian singer and composer (d. 2013) 
  1919   – Mohammed Karim Lamrani, Moroccan businessman and politician, 7th Prime Minister of Morocco (d. 2018)
  1919   – Dan O'Herlihy, Irish-American actor (d. 2005)
1921 – Vladimir Colin, Romanian journalist and author (d. 1991)
1922 – Alastair Gillespie, Canadian scholar and politician (d. 2018)
1923 – Joseph Heller, American novelist, short story writer, and playwright (d. 1999)
  1923   – Antônio Maria Mucciolo, Italian-Brazilian archbishop (d. 2012)
  1923   – Marcel Rayman, Polish soldier (d. 1944)
1924 – Evelyn Boyd Granville, American mathematician, computer scientist, and academic
  1924   – Karel Kachyňa, Czech director and screenwriter (d. 2004)
  1924   – Terry Southern, American novelist, essayist, and screenwriter (d. 1995)
1925 – Chuck Bednarik, American lieutenant and football player (d. 2015)
  1925   – Scott Carpenter, American commander, pilot, and astronaut (d. 2013)
  1925   – Sardar Fazlul Karim, Bangladeshi philosopher, scholar, and academic (d. 2014)
1926 – Peter Lax, Hungarian-American mathematician and academic
1927 – Gary Bertini, Israeli conductor and composer (d. 2005)
  1927   – Laura Betti, Italian actress (d. 2004)
  1927   – Albert Zafy, Malagasy politician, 3rd President of Madagascar (d. 2017)
  1927   – Bernard Vukas, Yugoslav-Croatian footballer (d. 1983)
1928 – Sonny James, American singer-songwriter and guitarist (d. 2016)
  1928   – Delfim Netto, Brazilian economist
1929 – Ralf Dahrendorf, German-English sociologist and politician (d. 2009)
  1929   – Sonny Ramadhin, Trinidadian cricketer (d. 2022)
1930 – Ollie Matson, American sprinter and football player (d. 2011)
  1930   – Richard Riordan, American lieutenant and politician, 39th Mayor of Los Angeles and publisher
  1930   – Little Walter Jacobs, American blues harp player and singer (d. 1968)
1931 – Naim Attallah, Palestinian author (d. 2021)
1932 – Sandy Woodward, English admiral (d. 2013)
  1932   – Tabibar Rahman Sarder, Bangladeshi politician. (d. 2010)
1934 – Cuauhtémoc Cárdenas, Mexican politician
  1934   – Tang Chang, Thai artist (d. 1990)
  1934   – Shirley Horn, American singer and pianist (d. 2005)
  1934   – Phillip King, Tunisian-English sculptor
  1934   – John Meillon, Australian actor (d. 1989)
1936 – Danièle Huillet, French filmmaker (d. 2006)
  1936   – Hans E. Wallman, Swedish director, producer, and composer (d. 2014)
1937 – Una Stubbs, English actress and dancer (d. 2021)
1939 – Judy Collins, American singer-songwriter and guitarist
  1939   – Wilhelmina Cooper, Dutch model (d. 1980)
  1939   – Victor Davies, Canadian pianist, composer, and conductor
1943 – Vassal Gadoengin, Nauruan politician (d. 2004)
  1943   – Joe Walsh, Irish politician, Minister for Agriculture, Food and the Marine (d. 2014)
1945 – Rita Coolidge, American singer-songwriter
  1945   – Carson Whitsett, American keyboard player, songwriter, and producer (d. 2007)
1946 – Joanna Lumley, English actress, voice-over artist, author, and activist
  1946   – John Woo, Hong Kong director, producer, and screenwriter
1947 – Jacob Bekenstein, Mexican-born Israeli-American theoretical physicist (d. 2015)
  1947   – Sergio Infante, Chilean-Swedish poet and author
1948 – Györgyi Balogh, Hungarian sprinter
  1948   – Patricia Hill Collins, American sociologist and scholar
1949 – Jim Clench, Canadian bass player (d. 2010)
  1949   – Tim Hodgkinson, English saxophonist, clarinet player, and composer
  1949   – Paul Teutul Sr., American motorcycle designer, co-founded Orange County Choppers
1950 – Dann Florek, American actor and director
  1950   – Danny McGrain, Scottish footballer and coach
1951 – Gordon Greenidge, Barbadian cricketer and coach
  1951   – Geoff Lees, English race car driver
  1951   – Sally Mann, American photographer
1952 – Richard Blundell, English economist and academic
  1952   – Kim Lewison, English lawyer and judge
  1952   – Peter Smith, Malaysian-born English academic and judge
1953 – Glen Ballard, American songwriter and producer
1954 – Ray Parker Jr., American singer-songwriter, guitarist, and producer 
  1954   – Joel Rosenberg, Canadian-American author and activist (d. 2011)
1955 – Alex Cunningham, Scottish politician
  1955   – Martin O'Donnell, American composer
  1955   – Ray Searage, American baseball player and coach
1956 – Catherine Frot, French actress
  1956   – Phil Foglio, American illustrator
1957 – Rick Darling, Australian cricketer
  1957   – Uberto Pasolini, Italian banker, director, and producer
1959 – Yasmina Reza, French actress and playwright
  1959   – Lawrence Seeff, South African cricketer and basket weaver
1960 – Steve Cauthen, American jockey and sportscaster
1961 – Sultan Günal-Gezer, Dutch politician
  1961   – Clint Malarchuk, Canadian ice hockey player and coach 
  1961   – Marilyn Milian, American judge 
  1961   – Vasiliy Sidorenko, Russian hammer thrower
1962 – Maia Morgenstern, Romanian actress
  1962   – Ted Sundquist, American football player, coach, and manager
1964 – Yvonne van Gennip, Dutch speed skater
1966 – Olaf Thon, German footballer and manager 
1967 – Tim McGraw, American singer-songwriter and actor
1968 – Oliver Bierhoff, German footballer and manager
  1968   – D'arcy Wretzky, American bass player and singer
1969 – Wes Anderson, American director, producer, and screenwriter
  1969   – Mary Lou McDonald, Irish politician
  1969   – Billy Owens, American basketball player
1970 – Bernard Butler, English singer-songwriter, guitarist, and producer 
  1970   – Sacha Perry, American jazz pianist and composer
1971 – Ethan Albright, American football player 
  1971   – Stuart Appleby, Australian golfer
  1971   – Kim Grant, South African tennis player
  1971   – Artur Kohutek, Polish hurdler and soldier
  1971   – Ajith Kumar, Indian film actor in Tamil cinema and race car driver
1972 – Ramzi bin al-Shibh, Yemeni terrorist
  1972   – Julie Benz, American actress
  1972   – Yoon Hae-young, South Korean actress
1973 – Peter Baah, English footballer and manager 
  1973   – Mike Jesse, German footballer
  1973   – Curtis Martin, American football player
  1973   – Oliver Neuville, German footballer
1975 – Austin Croshere, American basketball player and sportscaster
  1975   – Marc-Vivien Foé, Cameroonian footballer (d. 2003)
  1975   – Nina Hossain, English journalist 
  1975   – Alexey Smertin, Russian international footballer 
1976 – Patricia Stokkers, Dutch swimmer 
1977 – Vera Lischka, Austrian swimmer and politician
1978 – James Badge Dale, American actor
  1978   – Michael Russell, American tennis player
1979 – Mauro Bergamasco, Italian rugby player
  1979   – Roman Lyashenko, Russian ice hockey player (d. 2003)
1980 – Marvin Cabrera, Mexican footballer
  1980   – Rob Davison, Canadian ice hockey player and coach
  1980   – Inês Henriques, Portuguese race walker
  1980   – Jan Heylen, Belgian race car driver
  1980   – Jay Reatard, American singer-songwriter and guitarist (d. 2010)
  1980   – Yuliya Tabakova, Russian athlete
1981 – Manny Acosta, Panamanian baseball player
  1981   – Derek Asamoah, Ghanaian footballer
  1981   – Alexander Hleb, Belarusian footballer
  1981   – Wes Welker, American football player
1982 – Beto, Portuguese footballer
  1982   – Jamie Dornan, Northern Irish model and actor
  1982   – Mark Farren, Irish footballer (d. 2016)
  1982   – Katya Zamolodchikova, American drag queen
  1982   – Tommy Robredo, Spanish tennis player
  1982   – Darijo Srna, Croatian footballer
1983 – Alain Bernard, French swimmer
  1983   – Human Tornado, American wrestler
  1983   – Park Hae-jin, South Korean actor
1984 – David Backes, American ice hockey player
  1984   – Mišo Brečko, Slovenian footballer
  1984   – Patrick Eaves, American ice hockey player
  1984   – Alexander Farnerud, Swedish footballer
  1984   – Farah Fath, American actress
  1984   – Keiichiro Koyama, Japanese singer and actor
  1984   – Víctor Montaño, Colombian footballer
  1984   – Mark Seaby, Australian footballer
1985 – Shahriar Nafees, Bangladeshi cricketer
1986 – Christian Benítez, Ecuadorian footballer (d. 2013)
  1986   – Adam Casey, Australian footballer
  1986   – Cassie Jaye, American actress and film director
  1986   – Jesse Klaver, Dutch politician
  1986   – Lee Chang-min, South Korean singer
  1986   – Brent Stanton, Australian footballer
1987 – Leonardo Bonucci, Italian footballer
  1987   – Glen Coffee, American football player
  1987   – Iván DeJesús Jr., Puerto Rican baseball player
  1987   – Marcus Drum, Australian footballer
  1987   – Jerome Dyson, American basketball player
  1987   – Amir Johnson, American basketball player
  1987   – Ryan Mathews, American football player
  1987   – Saidi Ntibazonkiza, Burundian footballer
  1987   – Shahar Pe'er, Israeli tennis player
  1987   – Marissa Ponich, Canadian fencer
1988 – Maria Balaba, Latvian figure skater
  1988   – Maxim Gustik, Belarusian freestyle skier
  1988   – Teodor Peterson, Swedish cross-country skier
  1988   – Anushka Sharma, Indian actress and film producer
1989 – Alejandro Arribas, Spanish footballer
  1989   – Poļina Jeļizarova, Latvian runner
1990 – Uriel Álvarez, Mexican footballer 
  1990   – Caitlin Stasey, Australian actress
  1990   – Diego Contento, German footballer
  1990   – Scooter Gennett, American baseball player
1991 – Marcus Stroman, American baseball player
  1991   – Daniel Talbot, British sprinter
1992 – Hani, South Korean singer and actress
  1992   – Trevor Philp, Canadian alpine skier
  1992   – Bradley Roby, American football player
1993 – Jean-Christophe Bahebeck, French footballer
  1993   – Ifeoma Nwoye, Nigerian wrestler
1994 – Wallace Oliveira, Brazilian footballer
1995 – Collin Seedorf, Dutch footballer
1996 – Christopher J. Alexis Jr., Grenadian road cyclist
  1996   – Daniel Saifiti, Australian-Fijian rugby league player
  1996   – Jacob Saifiti, Australian-Fijian rugby league player
  1996   – Michael Seaton, Jamaican footballer
  1996   – William Nylander, Canadian-Swedish ice hockey player
2004 – Charli D'Amelio, American social media influencer and dancer
2005 – Linda Fruhvirtova, Czech tennis player

Deaths

Pre-1600
 408 – Arcadius, Byzantine emperor (b. 377)
 558 – Marcouf, missionary and saint
 908 – Wang Zongji, Chinese prince and pretender
1118 – Matilda of Scotland (b. 1080)
1171 – Diarmait Mac Murchada, King of Leinster (b. 1110)
1187 – Roger de Moulins, Grand Master of the Knights Hospitaller
1255 – Walter de Gray, English prelate and statesman
1277 – Stefan Uroš I of Serbia (b. 1223)
1278 – William II of Villehardouin
1308 – Albert I of Germany (b. 1255)
1312 – Paul I Šubić of Bribir
1539 – Isabella of Portugal (b. 1503)
1555 – Pope Marcellus II (b. 1501)
1572 – Pope Pius V (b. 1504)

1601–1900
1668 – Frans Luycx, Flemish painter (b. 1604)
1730 – François de Troy, French painter and engraver (b. 1645)
1731 – Johann Ludwig Bach, German violinist and composer (b. 1677)
1738 – Charles Howard, 3rd Earl of Carlisle, English politician, First Lord of the Treasury (b. 1669)
1772 – Gottfried Achenwall, Polish-German historian, economist, and jurist (b. 1719)
1813 – Jean-Baptiste Bessières, French general (b. 1768)
1838 – Antoine Louis Dugès, French obstetrician and naturalist (b. 1797)
1856 – John Wilbur, American minister and theologian (b. 1774)
1873 – David Livingstone, Scottish-English missionary and explorer (b. 1813)
1899 – Ludwig Büchner, German physiologist and physician (b. 1824)

1901–present
1904 – Antonín Dvořák, Czech composer and academic (b. 1841)
1907 – Grigorios Maraslis, Greek philanthropist (b. 1831) 
1913 – John Barclay Armstrong, American lieutenant (b. 1850)
1920 – Princess Margaret of Connaught (b. 1882)
1935 – Henri Pélissier, French cyclist (b. 1889)
1943 – Johan Oscar Smith, Norwegian religious leader, founded the Brunstad Christian Church (b. 1871)
1944 – Napoleon Soukatzidis, Greek communist and trade unionist (b. 1909) 
1945 – Joseph Goebbels, German lawyer and politician, Chancellor of Germany (b. 1897)
  1945   – Magda Goebbels, German wife of Joseph Goebbels (b. 1901)
1953 – Everett Shinn, American painter and illustrator (b. 1876)
1956 – LeRoy Samse, American pole vaulter (b. 1883)
1960 – Charles Holden, English architect, designed the Bristol Central Library (b. 1875)
1963 – Lope K. Santos, Filipino lawyer and politician (b. 1879)
1965 – Spike Jones, American singer and bandleader (b. 1911)
1968 – Jack Adams, Canadian-American ice hockey player, coach, and manager (b. 1895)
  1968   – Harold Nicolson, English author and politician (b. 1886)
1970 – Yi Un, Korean prince (b. 1897)
1973 – Asger Jorn, Danish painter and sculptor (b. 1914)
1976 – T. R. M. Howard, American surgeon and activist (b. 1908)
  1976   – Alexandros Panagoulis, Greek poet and politician (b. 1939)
1978 – Aram Khachaturian, Armenian composer and conductor (b. 1903)
1982 – William Primrose, Scottish viola player and educator (b. 1903)
1984 – Jüri Lossmann, Estonian-Swedish runner (b. 1891)
1985 – Denise Robins, English journalist and author (b. 1897)
1986 – Hylda Baker, English comedian, actress and music hall performer (b. 1905)
  1986   – Hugo Peretti, American songwriter and producer (b. 1916)
1988 – Ben Lexcen, Australian sailor and architect (b. 1936)
1989 – Sally Kirkland, American journalist (b. 1912)
  1989   – V. M. Panchalingam, Sri Lankan civil servant (b. 1930)
  1989   – Patrice Tardif, Canadian farmer and politician (b. 1904)
1990 – Sergio Franchi, Italian-American tenor and actor (b. 1926)
1991 – Richard Thorpe, American director and screenwriter (b. 1896)
1993 – Pierre Bérégovoy, French metallurgist and politician, Prime Minister of France (b. 1925)
  1993   – Ranasinghe Premadasa, Sri Lankan politician, 3rd President of Sri Lanka (b. 1924)
1994 – Ayrton Senna, Brazilian race car driver (b. 1960)
1995 – Antonio Salemme, Italian-American painter (b. 1892)
1997 – Fernand Dumont, Canadian sociologist, philosopher, and poet (b. 1927)
1998 – Eldridge Cleaver, American author and activist (b. 1935)
2000 – Steve Reeves, American bodybuilder and actor (b. 1926)
2002 – Ebrahim Al-Arrayedh, Indian poet and author (b. 1908) 
2003 – Miss Elizabeth, American wrestler and manager (b. 1960)
  2003   – Wim van Est, Dutch cyclist (b. 1923)
2005 – Kenneth Clark, American psychologist and academic (b. 1914)
2008 – Anthony Mamo, Maltese judge and politician, 1st President of Malta (b. 1909)
  2008   – Philipp von Boeselager, German soldier and economist (b. 1917)
2010 – Helen Wagner, American actress (b. 1918)
2011 – Henry Cooper, English boxer (b. 1934)
  2011   – Ted Lowe, English sportscaster (b. 1920)

2012 – James Kinley, Canadian engineer and politician, 29th Lieutenant Governor of Nova Scotia (b. 1925)
  2012   – Mordechai Virshubski, German-Israeli lawyer and politician (b. 1930)
2013 – Chris Kelly, American rapper  (b. 1978)
  2013   – Pierre Pleimelding, French footballer and manager (b. 1952)
2014 – Adamu Atta, Nigerian lawyer and politician, 5th Governor of Kwara State (b. 1927)
  2014   – Radhia Cousot, Tunisian-American computer scientist and academic (b. 1947)
  2014   – Assi Dayan, Israeli actor, director, and screenwriter (b. 1945)
  2014   – Juan de Dios Castillo, Mexican footballer and coach (b. 1951)
2015 – Geoff Duke, English-Manx motorcycle racer (b. 1923)
  2015   – Vafa Guluzade, Azerbaijani political scientist, academic, and diplomat (b. 1940)
  2015   – María Elena Velasco, Mexican actress, singer, director, and screenwriter (b. 1940)
  2015   – Grace Lee Whitney, American actress (b. 1930)
2021 – Olympia Dukakis, American actress (b. 1931)

Holidays and observances
 Christian feast day:
 Andeolus
 Augustin Schoeffler, Jean-Louis Bonnard (part of Vietnamese Martyrs)
 Benedict of Szkalka
 Brioc
 James the Less (Anglican Communion)
 Joseph the Worker (Roman Catholic)
 Blessed Klymentiy Sheptytsky (Ukrainian Greek Catholic Church)
 Marcouf
 Philip the Apostle (Anglican Communion, Lutheran Church)
 Richard Pampuri
 Sigismund of Burgundy
 Ultan
 May 1 (Eastern Orthodox liturgics)
 Armed Forces Day (Mauritania)
 Constitution Day (Argentina, Latvia, Marshall Islands)
 Commemoration of the states of Maharashtra and Gujarat following the foundation of Samyukta Maharashtra Samiti (India):
 Maharashtra Day
 International Sunflower Guerrilla Gardening Day 
 Lei Day (Hawaii)
 International Workers' Day or Labour Day (International), and its related observances:
 Law Day (United States), formerly intended to counterbalance the celebration of Labour Day. (United States)
 Loyalty Day, formerly intended to counterbalance the celebration of Labour Day. (United States)
 May Day (beginning of Summer) observances in the Northern hemisphere (see April 30):
Calan Mai (Wales)
Samhain (Celtic neopagans and Wiccans in the Southern Hemisphere)

References

External links

 BBC: On This Day
 
 Historical Events on May 1

Days of the year
May